The Society for the Prevention of Cruelty to Animals (SPCA) is a registered charity to promote animal welfare in Hong Kong, with outreach services to China.

History

The organisation was the first charity in Hong Kong to deal with a full range of animal welfare concerns. It was founded by a group of volunteers in 1903, who operated it mainly on a volunteer basis. Activities were suspended in 1914 due to the outbreak of World War I. It was re-established in 1921, with the Governor Reginald Edward Stubbs as president and patron.

In 1922, the SPCA's first Dog's Home opened on Waterloo Road, Kowloon. Following the loss of that site in 1934, a new expanded boarding kennel was opened in Kowloon City, which housed many animals left by people fleeing the area during the Second World War.

The society's first veterinary clinic opened in Kowloon in 1953.  An expanded animal clinic offering free services to pet owners was opened in the 1960s.  The first mobile vet clinic was offered in 1987.

In the 1950s, cat boxes were introduced as places for people to leave unwanted cats and kittens. The cat box locations were expanded in 1970. In 2000, the organisation took a different approach, pioneering the Cat Colony Care Programme in Asia involving trap-neuter-return. In 2014, the society reported on its website that 5,000 cats' lives are ended annually in its care and that of the Agriculture, Fisheries and Conservation Department, a reduction from 40,000 in 1963.

In 2012, the Barking Lot Cafe (Stanley Adoption Centre) opened in Stanley.

Renaming
In 1978, the society was formally named the Royal Society for the Prevention of Cruelty to Animals (皇家防止虐待禽畜會). In 1995, members voted at an annual general meeting to drop the prefix "Royal" from the Society's name, with the new name going into effect on 1 January 1997.

Mission
The society's mission is "to curb cruelty to animals, to protect their health and welfare, to prevent cruelty and through education, to inspire in the community a deep respect for life so that all living creatures may live together in harmony."

Current structure
The Society is run by an executive committee elected by members who provide veterinary services and fund-raising programmes to support the organisation economically.

The current President of The SPCA (HK) is the former TVB actress, Gigi Fu (傅明憲). The Patron of the Society is the wife of Hong Kong's former Chief Executive CY Leung, Mrs. Regina Leung.

The SPCA (HK)'s headquarters is in Wan Chai at Hong Kong Island. Other SPCA (HK) centres are located in Pok Fu Lam, Ho Man Tin, Mong Kok, Sai Kung, Cheung Chau, Mui Wo and Hang Hau to provide veterinary and homing services for animals in need.

Campaigns
Some of the campaigns underway include:

Ban shark fin soup
Focusing on the cruelty involved in the finning and killing of over 70 million sharks per year, the organization joined with other ocean conservation groups to call for the end of the shark finning trade. The society took part in canvassing hotels and clubs, calling for them to drop shark's fin soup from their menus. As a result, two leading hotels dropped the soup from their menus, and the airline Cathay Pacific agreed to cease shipping unsustainable sharks fin products across all their airline routes.

More public areas for dogs
The society is working to increase access to public areas for pets, which are very limited in Hong Kong. "Ideally, we would like to see all public spaces open to pets, the idea being that every pet owner is within a 15 minute walk of a public space in which to exercise their dog." The society is working to increase awareness of the benefits to both animals and their guardians, and to develop a strategic plan.

TNR program for stray dogs and cats
With the successful experience of the trap-neuter-return program for free-roaming cats, the society has lobbied for a similar program to be tried for stray dogs. In 2012, local governments in three proposed locations for trials voted against the measures. The organization continues to search for suitable TNR trial locations.

End the seal hunt
The society is campaigning alongside other animal welfare groups to ban the seal hunt in Canada. Following a ban of the products by the European Economic Community, Canada announced an agreement to sell seal meat to China. The SPCA(HK) is working to ban the products in Hong Kong. "By banning seal products in Hong Kong, we will not only be closing the market here, but also have a knock-on effect on China and Asia, and send a clear message to the Canadian government." In 2014, Canadian officials reported that the government of China backed away from the deal to buy seal meat after pressure from animal welfare groups.

Financial information

Table 1 Net revenue for the year

Animal welfare programs

Inspectorate
Responsible for the rescue and collection of stray or injured animals. Investigates suspected animal cruelty cases jointly with the Hong Kong Police Force and The Agriculture, Fisheries and Conservation Department under the Animal Watch Scheme.

Education

Organize school visit and exhibition in shopping malls to spread the message of compassion, respect and care for animals. In 2007–08 289 talks were given to young people reaching 20,004 audiences. The SPCA website is also committed to educating the public on how to look after pets responsibly. Vet's Corner and the Treasure of Knowledge pages are full of useful information such as what to do if your pet becomes ill.

Homing and adoption

Vaccinate, treat and find new homes for abandoned animals. In year 2007 to 2008, 2904 animals were successfully adopted. Animals who can not be adopted after a certain time may have to be put down.

Fostering

Look for foster parents for puppies and kittens which are too young to leave their mothers. Foster parents generally look after the young animals until a permanent home can be found.

Surrenders

The SPCA (HK) has a policy of Responsible Pet Ownership (RPO) as a solution to reduce the overpopulation of abandoned animals. Surrender can only be done in office hours, so that the SPCA (HK) staff can try to ascertain the reason for the surrender.

Behaviour Training

Offers training programmes, including Puppy Socialisation Training and Basic Obedience Training.

Homing Hearing Dog Programme

Assign hearing dog to the people in need, they serve as their ears and eyes.

Pet care services

Includes boarding services, grooming, and veterinary services. Provide regular veterinary services to their member's companion animals at static clinics and the mobile clinic vehicle. Special veterinary services include "Weight Management Clinics" and "Wellness Clinics" for animals in need. According to the Annual Report 04–05, 64,969 animals had been given veterinary treatment from their clinics during that year.

SNAP - Spay Neuter Assistance Program
Assistance is available to residents of Hong Kong who cannot afford to spay or neuter their pets.

Controversy

The SPCA (HK)'s policy on animal euthanasia has long been controversial among animal lovers and pet owners. According to the SPCA (HK)'s annual report, 4128 animals were put down by the society in 2007 to 08.

In November 2013, about 20 activists protested outside the society's Wan Chai headquarters, accusing the society of abandoning its mission: "The SPCA should try harder to save animals under its care, such as appealing to animal lovers through social media, before taking that final step to conduct euthanasia," stated one protester, who took issue with about half of the 10,000 abandoned animals the SPCA receives each year being euthanised.

Publications
Pawprints(足印) is a quarterly newsletter published by the SPCA (HK). Its contents range from the SPCA (HK) news and announcements to international news concerning animal welfare. Interviews with the SPCA (HK) staff and vets are also featured. The public can go to their official website to read the past issues of Pawprints.

See also
Animal Rights
Cruelty to animals
Humane Society
Overpopulation (animals)

References

External links

 Official website

Animal welfare organisations based in Hong Kong
Organizations established in 1997
Organisations based in Hong Kong with former royal patronage